Heavy Jelly - There are three bands of this name.

The band Skip Bifferty, under a pseudonym (1969)
A completely separate band from Skip Bifferty, but performing at the same time and using the same Heavy Jelly name, featuring Jackie Lomax as lead singer, prior to the commencement of his solo career.
A band created by Simon Napier-Bell whose records were only issued in the States.